The commune of Bukirasazi is a southern commune of Gitega Province in central Burundi. The capital lies at Bukirasazi.

References

Communes of Burundi
Gitega Province